Olivia Lee (born 27 August 1981) is a British comedian, actress and writer.

Early life
Lee is from a Jewish family. She studied acting at the Central School of Speech and Drama.

Career
Lee landed a presenting job alongside Simon Amstell on Channel 4's T4. She later appeared on comedy show Balls of Steel, where she pulled pranks such as interviewing celebrities with a penis-shaped microphone. She was later given her own show on Channel 4, Naughty Bits, and performed hidden camera pranks on The Tonight Show with Jay Leno.

Lee appeared in an episode of The Basil Brush Show in 2004. In 2006, she was interviewed and featured in a photoshoot for FHM. In March 2009, she appeared as a guest on internet talk show Tom Green's House Tonight. Dirty Sexy Funny, a hidden camera show, which originally piloted on Channel 4 in 2008, began airing on Comedy Central in March 2010 and ran for two season. Lee was the host of the Fox Reality Channel game show Battle of the Bods before Fox Reality's dissolution ended its run.

In January 2012, it was announced that Lee would join the cast of Balls of Steel Australia for its second series. Her act in the show is "Prank TV Oz", in which she pranks various members of the public while taking on different personas in a similar manner to her hidden camera show Dirty Sexy Funny.

Lee appeared on a celebrity edition of Channel 4 game show The Bank Job for charity.

The USA soon came calling and Olivia was invited to regularly appear on NBC’s The Tonight Show With Jay Leno where she wrote and provided her own brand of outrageous comedy for the show. That led to truTV giving Olivia her own comedy pilot ‘The Olivia Lee Show’ – which Ben Stiller produced with his company Red Hour.

She’s just finished filming ‘Who's The Daddy’ which will be released later this year, and also
just finished filming her own pilot ‘Make Me A Misogynist’ which she created and wrote for C4. You can also catch her in the latest series of ‘In The Long Run’ on SKY.

Last year she launched her first album with Universal records; ‘Mindful Mum; How Not To Lose Your Total Fucking Shit’ a unique spin on mindfulness, this proved to be a huge hit so Olivia turned it into a live show ‘Olivia Lee; Losing Her Total Fucking Shit’ which pays homage to female anger, she toured this across London and a national tour of this is planned for 2021.

An accomplished writer Olivia also has many scripted sit-com / comedy drama projects in development.

Personal life
Lee is married to Dan Renton Skinner, the couple have a child together.  They met when they both appeared on a celebrity version of Come Dine with Me.

References

External links

20th-century births
Living people
English Jews
English women comedians
Place of birth missing (living people)
Year of birth missing (living people)